Tan Keng Liang (born 14 November 1977), is a politician in Malaysia but has not been elected in either State or Parliament Seats, who is currently the Parti Gerakan Rakyat Malaysia (Gerakan) Youth Chief. Gerakan is a component of Malaysia's previous ruling coalition, Barisan Nasional (BN). He won the election for the post of Gerakan Youth head for the 2013/2016 session at the Gerakan Youth and Wanita wings' conference defeating Oh Tong Keong.

Over the usage of the word "Allah" in The Herald, he said the Barisan Nasional supreme council should also convene an emergency meeting as soon as possible to resolve the dispute once and for all.  He urged the Barisan Nasional supreme council to take a firm and fair stand on the "Allah" issue soon and wants BN leadership to reach an amicable solution to resolve the contentious matter after seeking views of all its 13 component parties. He said this in an e-statement in response to the Court of Appeal (COA) decision to stop the Catholic weekly periodical The Herald from using the term "Allah" in its Bahasa Malaysia publication as a reference to "God".

Election results

References

See also

1958 births
Living people
Malaysian politicians
Parti Gerakan Rakyat Malaysia politicians